There is a significant Asian presence in Africa of at least 3 million people. Most arriving following European settlement in the late 19th and early 20th century but there is continued immigration to the continent to pursue economic opportunities.

Asians in Africa 

 (1,600,000)

 (1,110,000)

 (945,000)

 (929,000)

 (324,000)

 (310,000)

 (300,000)

 (227,000)

 (170,000)

 (150,000)

 (125,000)

 (113,000)

 (100,000)

 (100,000)

 (90,000)

 (90,000)

 (82,000)

 (64,000)

 (50,000)

 (45,000)

 (44,000)

 (40,000)

 (40,000)

 (25,000)

 (20,000)

 (19,000)

 (13,000)

 (12,000)

 (10,000)

 (9,000)

 (8,000)

 (5,000)

 (5,000)

 (5,000)

 (3,700)

 (3,000)

 (3,000)

 (3,000)

 (3,000)

 (2,000)

 (1,200)

 (1,000)

Chinese in Africa

The African continent is seeing a very rapidly growing number of Chinese immigrants coming to the continent for economic opportunities. Many of the first Chinese people on the continent were brought as contract labourers, similarly to the Indian community. Over 1 million Chinese workers currently live in Africa. ~400,000 Chinese live in South Africa, 100,000 in Madagascar, 100,000 in Zambia, 74,000 in Sudan, 60,000 in Ethiopia, 50,000 in Angola, 50,000 in Kenya, 50,000 in Nigeria, 50,000 in Uganda, 40,000 in Algeria, 40,000 in Chad, 130,000 in Namibia, 35,000 in Mauritius, 30,000 in Tanzania, 25,000 in the Republic of the Congo, 20,000 in Lesotho, 12,000 in Mozambique and 10,000 in Egypt. 9,000 Chinese live in Zimbabwe, 6,000 in Botswana, 5,000 in Cameroon, 5,000 in Equatorial Guinea, 5,000 in Guinea, 3,000 in Djibouti, 3,000 in Malawi, 3,000 in Mali, 3,000 in Togo 2,000 in Senegal 1,000 in Niger and 1,000 Chinese live in South Sudan. Most of the estimated 50,000 Chinese people in the DRC live in Kinshasa or work for the mining companies of Haut-Katanga Province.

National Geographic also published an article by Frank Viviano; in July 2005, he visited Pate Island. During the time he stayed on Lamu, ceramic fragments had been found around Lamu which the administrative officer of the local Swahili history museum claimed were of Chinese origin, specifically from Zheng He's voyage to east Africa. The eyes of the Pate people resembled Chinese and Famao and Wei were some of the names among them which were speculated to be of Chinese origin. Their ancestors were said to be from indigenous women who intermarried with Chinese Ming sailors when they were shipwrecked. Two places on Pate were called "Old Shanga", and "New Shanga", which the Chinese sailors had named. A local guide who claimed descent from the Chinese showed Frank a graveyard made out of coral on the island, indicating that they were the graves of the Chinese sailors, which the author described as "virtually identical", to Chinese Ming dynasty tombs, complete with "half-moon domes" and "terraced entries".

Indians in Africa
The Indian community in Africa is found throughout the continent with large communities existing in South Africa, Mauritius, Réunion, and other parts of the continent. The arrival of Indians on the continent often coincides with the expanding European presence on the continent. There continues to be a notable Indian presence with numbers currently estimating roughly 2,750,000 Indians on the continent. There have historically been and continue to be tensions between Indians and native African communities throughout the continent. The most notable example being the expulsion of Indians by Ugandan dictator Idi Amin. Other Indians came more recently to Africa as traders and professional workers especially in Mozambique with its huge group of Indians. The 70,000 Indians in Mozambique have had a long history with their origins in Mozambique. The African nations with the largest Indian communities are South Africa with 1,560,000, Mauritius with 894,000, Nigeria with 800,000, Réunion with 280,250, Kenya with 110,000, Mozambique with 70,000, Tanzania with 60,000, Uganda with 50,000, Madagascar with 25,000, Zambia with 13,000 and Ghana, Malawi, the Seychelles and Zimbabwe with 10,000. 8,000 Indians live in Botswana, 8,000 in São Tomé and Príncipe, 3,000 in Rwanda, 2,700 in South Sudan, Burundi with 2,000 and Eritrea with 1,200. 20,000 foreigners of which 4,372 are Indians work in the DR Congo for MONUSCO. People from India, Bangladesh, Pakistan and Uruguay are the main workers for MONUSCO in the DR Congo.

Indians in South Africa

The first Indians in South Africa arrived on the Cape of Good Hope as slaves brought by the Dutch East Indies Company in 1654, however these slaves were fully assimilated into the Afrikaner and Coloured communities. The most significant migrations of Indians came when the Natal become a British colony and large numbers were brought as indentured labourers. Often serving as labourers on sugar plantations, but also in coal mines. More than 150,000 Indians were brought to the Natal over the course of 5 decades. The long term result was that by 1904 the Indian presence in the Natal outnumbered the white presence. The Indian community has faced legal discrimination.

Indians in East Africa

In 1887 the British East Africa Association was formed in Bombay, and was later given a Royal Charter becoming the Imperial British East Africa Association. In 1895 the East Africa Protectorate took over the assets and personnel of the Imperial British East Africa Association, and began construction of the Uganda Railway. Recruitment for the railway was outsourced to A.M. Jeevanjee of Karachi, and large numbers of labourers sourced from the Punjab. Over the course of six years, 32,000 labourers were recruited. Many settled in the region at the end of their contracts and brought family over from India. These early settlers were accompanied by increasing numbers of migrants from Gujarat, Punjab, and western India seeking out new opportunities in the region.

Large numbers of the Asian community left east Africa in the 1960s and 1970s due to racial tensions post-independence. In 1972, Idi Amin, dictator of Uganda, expelled all Asians and confiscated their property. At the time, Asians accounted for 90% of the country's businesses and tax revenues.  Since the 1980s, the Ugandan government has encouraged the return of those Asians who were expelled.

On 22 July 2017, the Asian community were officially recognised as the 44th tribe of Kenya, recognising the community's contribution to Kenya from the dawn of the nation.

Lebanese in Africa
Over 500,000 people from Lebanon moved to Africa. 0.1% of West Africans are of Lebanese descent. 300,000 Lebanese people live in the Ivory Coast (1.2% of total population), 150,000 live in Sierra Leone (2% of total population), 75,000 live in Nigeria, 40,000 live in Senegal and 9,000 live in DR Congo. Thousands of Lebanese also moved to The Gambia and Ghana. 3,500 people from Europe and Lebanon live in The Gambia, representing 0.23% of its total population. 3,000 Lebanese and 2,000 Europeans live in Liberia, representing 0.1% of its population.

Syrians in Africa

300,000 refugees from Syria moved to Egypt according to the Ministry of Foreign Affairs. 250,000 refugees from Syria moved to Sudan in recent years. They represent 0.6% of its total population. Most of the Syrians live in Khartoum, where they represent an estimated 4% of the total population.

Austronesians
The Merina people of Madagascar along with the Betsileo tribe are likely of Austronesian descent. Together, they represent about 35% of the population of the island of Madagascar. These two dominant ethnic groups are commonly accepted as indigenous to Madagascar, though they are likely descendants of Malay and Polynesian immigrations. For example, the Malagasy language is unrelated to nearby African languages, instead being the westernmost member of the Malayo-Polynesian branch of the Austronesian language family.

Eurasians in Africa
Here is a list with the 12 million Eurasians living in Africa, see also White Africans of European ancestry. The countries in the list are ranked by population of non-African heritage, followed by main immigration country. The amount of mixed race Africans with at least one Eurasian ancestor is over 10% of the total population of Africa, or at least 150 million people. 6.2 million Eurasians live in Southern Africa (9.2% of total population), 2.4 million in Western Africa (0.59%), 2.2 million in Eastern Africa (0.49%), 931,000 in Northern Africa (0.36%) and 570,000 in Central Africa (0.31%).

 5,860,000 (Netherlands, 10% of total population) 11 million including mixed race

 1,061,000 (India, 0.52% of total population)

 939,000 (India, 74.2% of total population)

 716,000 (China, 2.32% of total population)

 350,000 (Portugal, 1.09% of total population) 1.3 million including mixed race

 329,000 (0.32% of total population) 50 million including mixed race

 325,000 (Syria, 0.81% of total population) Over 1% including mixed race

 315,000 (Lebanon, 1.3% of total population)

 250,000 (Netherlands, 10% of total population) 393,000 including mixed race

 211,000 (India, 0.42% of total population)

 164,000 (Portugal, 0.53% of total population)

 153,000 (China, 0.9% of total population) Over 1% including mixed race

 150,000 (Lebanon, 2.1% of total population)

 144,000 (China, 0.57% of total population) 8 million including mixed race

 115,000 (France, 1% of total population) Over 10% including mixed race

 110,000 (India, 0.25% of total population)

 102,000 (Mexico, 7.8% of total population) Over 10% including mixed race

 100,000 (China, 0.1% of total population)

 100,000 (France, 0.28% of total population) Over 10% including mixed race

 100,000 (India, 0.16% of total population)

 95,000 (France, 1.2% of total population)

 82,000 (Netherlands, 3.5% of total population)

 64,000 (China, 0.053% of total population) 56 million including mixed race

 52,000 (Yemen, 5.2% of total population) Over 10% including mixed race

 47,000 (United Kingdom, 0.33% of total population) 64,000 including mixed race

 41,000 (China, 0.26% of total population) Over 1% including mixed race

 40,000 (China, 0.09% of total population) Over 10% including mixed race

 40,000 (China, 0.76% of total population)

 32,000 (United Kingdom, 2.4% of total population)

 23,000 (India, 0.12% of total population)

 22,000 (Italy, 0.36% of total population) Over 10% including mixed race

 21,000 (China, 1% of total population)

 15,000 (France, 1% of total population)

 12,134 (China, 0.05% of total population)

 11,987 (France, 0.26% of total population)

 10,000 (France, 0.11% of total population)

 10,000 (China, 0.05% of total population)

 10,000 (India, 10.3% of total population)

 9,000 (Belgium, 0.075% of total population) Over 1% including mixed race

 8,703 (Portugal, 0.48% of total population) Over 1% including mixed race

 8,000 (India, 4% of total population)

 5,700 (India, 0.05% of total population)

 5,000 (France, 0.025% of total population)

 5,000 (Belgium, 0.045% of total population) Over 1% including mixed race

 5,000 (Portugal, 1% of total population) Over 10% including mixed race

 5,000 (China, 0.04% of total population)

 5,000 (Lebanon, 0.1% of total population)

 4,000 (China, 0.05% of total population)

 3,000 (United States, 0.02% of total population) Over 10% including mixed race

 2,000 (France, 0.01% of total population) Over 1% including mixed race

 1,600 (United Kingdom, 0.03% of total population) Over 10% including mixed race

 1,500 (United Kingdom, 0.07% of total population)

 1,200 (India, 0.02% of total population) Over 10% including mixed race

Angola also has 1 million people of mixed race (black and white), accounting for 3% of its total population. South Africa has 5,176,000 coloureds, Namibia 143,000 and Zimbabwe 17,000. At least 80 million people or 8% of the people living in Sub-Saharan Africa are Eurasians, mixed race (50% African and 50% Eurasian) or have at least one Eurasian ancestor. Ethiopia has 56 million, Egypt 50 million, South Africa 11 million and Madagascar 8 million. At least 10% of the people from Djibouti, Eritrea, Ethiopia, Madagascar, Mauritius, Namibia, the Seychelles, Somalia and South Africa have Eurasian ancestors. At least 10% of the people from Algeria, Egypt, Libya, Morocco and Tunisia also have Eurasian ancestors. The majority of the people from the Canary Islands, Cape Verde and Réunion have European ancestors. 1,425,760 white people live on the Canary Islands, which is part of Spanish Africa. 260,000 white people live on Réunion, which is part of the French territories in Africa. 2,500 Eurasian MINUSMA personnel, many from Bangladesh, China and Germany, live in Mali 3,000 soldiers from France, 3,000 other Chinese and 2,000 Syrians also live in Mali, which results in over 10,000 Eurasians living in Mali.

Countries with over 10 million people with Eurasian heritage: Algeria, Egypt, Ethiopia, Madagascar, Morocco, South Africa.

Countries with over 1 million people with Eurasian heritage: Angola, Ghana, Libya, Mauritius, Nigeria, Somalia, Tunisia.

See also

Afro-Asians
Asian people
Asian (South Africa)
 Africa–China relations
Chinese South Africans
Chinese people in Namibia
 Overseas Chinese
Ethnic groups in Asia
 Africa–India relations
Indian South Africans
Indians in Kenya
Indian diaspora in Southeast Africa
Indians in Tanzania
Indians in Uganda
Koreans in Africa
White Africans of European ancestry

References

Further reading
  Bharati, Agehanbanda. The Asians in East Africa. (1972) 
 Bharati, Agehananda. "The Indians in East Africa: a survey of problems of transition and adaptation." Sociologus 14.2 (1964): 169-177. online
 Jacobsen, Knut A., and Pratap Kumar, eds. South Asians in the diaspora: histories and religious traditions (Brill, 2018).
 Jain, Ravindra K. Indian communities abroad: Themes and literature (South Asia Books, 1993).
 Levinson, David et al. eds. The Encyclopedia of Modern Asia (6 vol Thomson-Gale, 2002) 1:31–35 and passim; basic introduction and articles on each group.
 Li, Anshan. A history of overseas Chinese in Africa to 1911 (Diasporic Africa Press, 2017).
 Mangat, J.S. A History of the Asians in East Africa: 1896-1965 (Oxford University Press, 1969)
 Raposo, Pedro Amakasu ed. Routledge Handbook of Africa-Asia Relations (2017) excerpt, comprehensive coverage
 Whiteley, W.H. ed. Language Use and Social Change: Problems of Multilingualism with Special Reference to Eastern Africa (1971)

External links
African map with % of people with Eurasian heritage per country
African map with people with Eurasian heritage per country
Asiansinafrica.com

Asian diaspora in Africa
Ethnic groups in Africa